Bedfont Football Club was a football club based in East Bedfont, Greater London, England.

History
The club was established in 1900 and joined the Combined Counties League in 1987, where it played until it folded in 2010. It reached the Third Round of the FA Vase twice in its history. During the 2010 strike by cabin crew from the Unite trade union working for British Airways, the club's home ground was used as a headquarters for the strikers. On 27 May 2010, the club informed the Combined Counties League that it would be unable to continue the football club due to financial considerations.

Feltham and Bedfont Town (a separate club) used The Orchard ground for their home games in 2010/11 and 2011/12.

In May 2012, Bedfont Town was on the brink of folding and it eventually left the Orchard. It was decided that Feltham FC would merge with landlords Bedfont Football and Social Club, who were previously involved with Bedfont F.C., to form a new club – Bedfont & Feltham F.C. As Feltham had already joined the FA Vase for 2012/13 only the Sunday teams could fully adopt the new name. The club will be fully operational as Bedfont and Feltham Football and Social Club.

References

External links
 Bedfont and Feltham Football and Social Club web site
 Map and Weather of Bedfont FC Stadium web site
 Combined Counties Football League web site

Defunct football clubs in England
Association football clubs established in 1900
Defunct football clubs in London
1900 establishments in England
Association football clubs disestablished in 2010
Combined Counties Football League